The United States Naval Academy Museum is a public maritime museum in Annapolis, Maryland, United States. A part of the United States Naval Academy, it is located at Preble Hall within the Academy premises. It is currently headed by Director CDR Claude Berube, PhD USNR.

History
The museum's history dates back to 1845, when it was founded as the Naval School Lyceum.  In 1849, President James K. Polk directed the Navy's collection of historic flags be sent to the new Naval School at Annapolis for care and display, establishing one of the museum's oldest collections. After the Civil War, the Navy Department began forwarding many types of objects to the Naval Academy Lyceum, including trophies of war, items from exploration/survey expeditions, diplomatic missions, and naval related art. The Lyceum also became the repository for  the collections of the U. S. Naval Lyceum at the New York Navy Yard in 1892, and received an extensive collection from the Boston Naval Library and Institute in 1922, significantly growing the collection.

The Naval Academy Lyceum of the 19th and early 20th centuries was located in several places around the Naval Academy Yard, before the construction of Preble Hall in 1939. From 2007–2008, Preble Hall underwent a complete renovation to turn the building into a modern museum, which officially reopened in the summer of 2009.

Collection

The collection reflects much of American naval history and partly the naval forces of other countries. That includes thousands of two- and three-dimensional objects such as flags, uniforms, weapons, medals, books, instruments and photographs as well as art. Major collections are The Rogers Ship Model Collection, the Naval Academy Art Collection (including c. 1,200 paintings), the Malcolm Storer Naval Medals Collection (including ancient coins) and The Beverley R. Robinson Collection (prints of naval history).

Exhibits and programming
Over the years, the museum has created a number of exhibits including: Sea, Sun, and Space, Philo McGiffin: A Man of Wit and Dash, Over There: The Navy and Marine Corps in World War I, Warrior Writers, From Conception to Present: The U.S. Navy's Aircraft Carrier, U.S. Navy Ships of War, and Seas, Lakes & Bay: The Naval War of 1812, and Ability, Not Gender.

It also hosts the Shifley Lecture Series and Preble Hall Podcast about U.S. Navy and Marine Corps history. It previously produced a podcast called "A History of the Navy in 100 Objects". Since 2017 it has also hosted the NavyCon convention dealing with naval history, navies in science fiction, and current issues.

See also
William W. Jeffries Memorial Archives (USNA archives)
List of museums in Maryland
List of maritime museums in the United States

References

External links

 

Maritime museums in Maryland
Museum
Marine art museums in the United States
Military and war museums in Maryland
Museums in Annapolis, Maryland
Art museums and galleries in Maryland
Academy